Jay Wynne (born c.1968) is a former BBC Weather forecaster, appearing mainly on BBC News 24, BBC Radio 4, BBC World and BBC One.

He was a main weather presenter on the BBC Ten O'Clock News, and occasionally the BBC Six O'Clock News and the BBC One O'Clock News.

Early life
Wynne was born in London to American parents and educated at Ardingly College, West Sussex. He studied Civil Engineering at Heriot-Watt University. Two years into his course he left, and worked as a technician for three years on offshore oil rigs in the North Sea. He went back to university and graduated in 1996 in Environmental Geography from the University of Aberdeen. He worked as an English teacher in 1997 in Fukuoka, Japan.

He graduated from Reading University with a MSc in Applied Meteorology in 1999.

Career
In 1999 he joined the Met Office undertaking a 14-month training programme, including a spell at RAF Northolt for six months. He joined the BBC Weather team in October 2000 - initially to present on BBC World and BBC Radio 4.

References

People educated at Ardingly College
Alumni of the University of Reading
Alumni of the University of Aberdeen
BBC weather forecasters
BBC World News
Black British television personalities
Living people
Year of birth missing (living people)